The Nevada Central Turntable in Austin, Nevada is a railway turntable that was built in 1880 and used until 1938.  It is located off Austin Roping Arena Rd., on the south side of U.S. 50.  It was listed on the National Register of Historic Places in 2003.

It was a work of Northwestern Construction Co. and of D. McDonald.

The site includes concrete foundations of a former engine house, with one stall for a single locomotive.  The engine house itself was disassembled and put into storage in the late 1900s, with view towards preservation/restoration somehow later.

References 

Industrial buildings and structures on the National Register of Historic Places in Nevada
Transport infrastructure completed in 1880
Buildings and structures in Lander County, Nevada
Railway turntables
National Register of Historic Places in Lander County, Nevada
Railway buildings and structures on the National Register of Historic Places in Nevada